Setanta Sports News was a television channel from Virgin Media Television and Setanta Sports. The channel launched on 29 November 2007. as a rolling 24-hour sports news channel using the strength of the Setanta Sports brand across the United Kingdom and Ireland. It was available to all Virgin Media customers and also free-to-view on satellite and online. The channel was seen as Virgin Media's rival to Sky Sports News, which was removed from their platform on 1 March 2007 as their contract with British Sky Broadcasting had ended. However, when Virgin Media reinstated Sky Sports News onto their television platform, their Setanta rival remained an active channel.

It was announced on 12 September 2007 that ITN was appointed producer of Setanta Sports News.

The channel was transmitted by Red Bee Media, who also play in the commercial breaks.

The channel closed at just before 6pm on Tuesday 23 June 2009, following financial difficulties.

History
Setanta Sports News was launched on 29 November 2007 on the Virgin Media and Sky Digital platforms. The Virgin Media Television network had previously expressed their interest in running a sports news channel, after BSkyB removed Sky Sports News from ntl:Telewest's successor Virgin Media. Some media sources have claimed that Setanta News is intended to be in direct competition with BSkyB's Sky Sports News, which has an average of around 0.6%. It was announced in the summer of 2007 that Virgin Media Television was to launch the new channel.

On 1 September 2008, the channel was given a new look. The format was changed from 4:3 to Widescreen. Viewers could see headlines along the length of the bottom of the screen, rather than across the top of the video section. There were other several minor changes, none of particular importance.

Over the course of the remainder of the year, channel producers experimented with different format designs, including removing the side bar over midweek.

Closure
On 23 June 2009, it was announced Setanta Sports had been placed into administration after rescue talks designed to secure new funding collapsed. Setanta Sports News closed on the same day, at 18:00, with 60 staff made redundant.

International coverage
From 1 January 2008, Setanta Sports News was broadcast live in one hour blocks on their domestic international stations in the Republic of Ireland (at 18:00 on Setanta Ireland), Australia, and the USA. In Australia, Setanta Sports News was shown live daily at 7am and 6pm EST (changing to 9am & 6pm EDT) and in the USA was shown live at 1am, 5pm, and 10pm ET.

On air team

References

External links
Setanta Sports News
Virgin Media
Setanta Sports

ITN
Living TV Group channels
Sports television channels in the United Kingdom
Television channels and stations established in 2007
Television channels and stations disestablished in 2009
Defunct television channels in the United Kingdom
Television stations in Ireland